The Wells–Denbrook Architects Office Building was built in 1954 for architects Theodore Wells and Myron E. Denbrook, Jr. in Grand Forks, North Dakota.  It was listed on the National Register of Historic Places in 2014.

The architectural firm had three eras:  that of Wells alone, then Wells and Denbrook, then Denbrook alone.

It may be characterized as Mid-Century Modern or California/Organic Modern or Desert Modern in style. It has various colors of brick, ribbon windows, an open porch, and a low-slope roof.

References

National Register of Historic Places in Grand Forks, North Dakota
Mid-century modern
Buildings and structures completed in 1954
1954 establishments in North Dakota
Commercial buildings on the National Register of Historic Places in North Dakota
Architecture firms based in North Dakota